Alexandra Sicotte-Levesque   founded Journalists for Human Rights (JHR) in 2002 with Benjamin Peterson. Sicotte-Levesque and Peterson were both awarded a Meritorious Service Medal (Canada) by the Canadian Governor-General for founding JHR in 2016. Sicotte-Levesque has also worked as a Radio Producer for the United Nations radio in Sudan (Radio Miraya). She also worked as the Country Director for the BBC World Service Trust in Sudan.

Sicotte-Levesque has a BA in International Studies from Vassar College and an MSc in Human Rights from the London School of Economics and Political Science (LSE).

In 2006 she was awarded a Global Youth Fellowship from the Walter and Duncan Gordon Foundation for her project When Silence is Golden], looking at the impact of Canadian gold mining activities on a small town in Western Ghana.

Sicotte-Levesque's feature film "The Longest Kiss" (A Jamais Pour Toujours) about Sudanese youth ahead of  the country's split in two, premiered at the Montreal International Documentary Film Festival (RIDM) where it received a special mention for the Magnus Isacsson prize and was broadcast on Super Channel.

References

Year of birth missing (living people)
Living people
Alumni of the London School of Economics
Canadian human rights activists
Women human rights activists
Canadian radio producers
Vassar College alumni
Women radio producers